Berlin, Wisconsin is a city in Green Lake County, Wisconsin.

Berlin, Wisconsin may refer to places in the U.S. state of Wisconsin:

Berlin (town), Green Lake County, Wisconsin, a town
Berlin, Marathon County, Wisconsin, a town

See also
New Berlin, Wisconsin, a city